Michael Joseph Harmon (born January 24, 1958) is an American professional stock car racing driver. He last competed part-time in the NASCAR Xfinity Series, driving the No. 47 Chevrolet Camaro for Mike Harmon Racing. In the past, he drove in the NASCAR Slim Jim All Pro Series, finishing 8th in points in 1997.

NASCAR career
Harmon made his NASCAR debut in 1996 driving the No. 24 Chevrolet at South Boston Speedway, where he finished 31st after a transmission failure. He ran seven more races in the car that season, with a best finish of 23rd, but a sponsorship struggle caused his team to close down. He was scheduled to return to NASCAR in 1999, when he signed with Donlavey Racing to compete for NASCAR Winston Cup Rookie of the Year honors. Harmon was reportedly fired from the team during preparation for that year's Daytona 500 when he refused to let another driver try to get more speed out of the car.

In 2001, Harmon returned to the Busch Series, driving fourteen races for Mixon Motorsports in the No. 44 Pontiac Grand Prix. His best finish was a 28th at Indianapolis Raceway Park, the only race he finished that year. He made an additional start for Moy Racing at Talladega Superspeedway, finishing 35th, and competed in two Craftsman Truck races for MB Motorsports and Troxell Racing, respectively. He made 25 starts for Mixon in 2002, with a best finish of 22nd at Daytona. The following season, he competed in a career-high total of 32 races and finished seventeen of them. With a new team partner in Global Industrial Contractors, Harmon had his first career top-twenty finish at IRP and finished 23rd in points.

GIC-Mixon switched to the No. 24 in 2004 and after the Aaron's 312, he was released from the team and replaced by Shane Hmiel. He made two more starts that season, his best finish being 33rd at Memphis Motorsports Park for Oostlander Racing. In 2005, Harmon and Oostlander purchased part of the assets of Innovative Motorsports and ran the first four races of the season in the No. 21 Chevrolet Silverado, before focusing mainly on ARCA racing. Harmon attempted a Busch Series race later in the year at Memphis for Bobby Norfleet, but did not qualify.

Harmon returned to NASCAR in 2007, driving the No. 44/No. 48 car for Richardson-Netzloff Racing in the Busch Series. He made seven races with a best finish of 38th before handing the ride off to Jennifer Jo Cobb late in the season. He attempted a larger part-time season in the No. 84 Chevrolet fielded by the new Elite 2 Racing team in 2008, for eighteen races. Harmon posted his best finish in the Nationwide Series to date, finishing 17th at the Aaron's 312.

In 2009, Harmon started racing in his own No. 84 car and then took over the No. 07 Chevrolet for SK Motorsports. He would also start and park in his own No. 24 in four Camping World Truck Series races. For 2010, Harmon has run part-time in the Truck Series for both Lafferty Motorsports and Daisy Ramirez Motorsports.

Harmon drove his own No. 74 Chevrolet in the 2011 season, running approximately half the season's races; he also competed in several Truck Series races later in the year. He returned to the Nationwide Series in the No. 74 in 2012 and 2013.

In the 2020 Xfinity season opener at Daytona, Harmon scored a career high finish of 16th.

2002 Bristol crash
Harmon is also famous for an incident at Bristol Motor Speedway in August 2002. Harmon was practicing his No. 44 car, when he crashed into the track's infield entry gate in Turn 2. The gate was improperly secured when Harmon's car crashed into it causing it to swing open. His car then impacted the end of the concrete wall head-on. The impact was so violent, the car was nearly split in half. The remnants of the vehicle were then struck by the car of Johnny Sauter, fortunately hitting the half that Harmon was not sitting in. Harmon walked away from the crash unharmed.

Mike Harmon Racing

For the last several years, Harmon has primarily competed in NASCAR driving his self owned 74 car in the Xfinity Series, as well as part-time in the 74 truck for his own team, with additional drivers filling out the schedule. Harmon is one of only two teams that still fields a Dodge Challenger in NASCAR and one of the few remaining owner/drivers. Harmon's team usually relies on week to week sponsorships to help keep his team open. In 2017, the team partnered with Veterans Motorsports Inc., a company that provides jobs for veterans; in accordance with the deal, MHR allowed veterans to work for the team.

The team also fields vehicles in the Truck Series, with the ride being filled primarily by Jordan Anderson. Anderson left the team after the 2015 season. Harmon attempted several races in early 2016, but failed to qualify. Tim Viens failed to qualify at Atlanta and he made the race at New Hampshire. Viens also withdrew at Las Vegas. Paige Decker ran at Martinsville. Jordan Anderson returned to the team at the penultimate race at Phoenix. Harmon formed partnerships with teams last year to get his truck on track. Faith Motorsports partnered with Harmon at Iowa but failed to qualify with Donnie Levister. They also attempted to run Bristol with Levister, but the team withdrew. Harmon partnered with Brandonbilt Motorsports at Texas (spring) with Viens driving. Harmon also partnered with Bolen Motorsports at Las Vegas, also with Viens driving. The team returned in 2017 at Daytona with Anderson, who failed to qualify.

In 2019, MHR partnered with Rick Ware Racing to field the No. 17. The following year, the team expanded to include a No. 47 car in addition to the primary No. 74.

In 2020, Harmon only ran the plate races in the No. 74 to make way for other drivers to drive his car. Joe Nemechek, Bayley Currey and Kyle Weatherman all drove races in the 2 cars. In the end, Currey went full-time in the 74 and Weatherman went full-time in the 47. The same lineup remained for 2021.

In 2021 at Phoenix Raceway, Currey got his & the teams best finish ever, finishing 7th.

NASCAR Xfinity Series

Car No. 74 History
In 2011, Harmon debuted the team and No. 74 at Auto Club Speedway, start and parking after 3 laps and finishing 43rd. The next race the No. 74 attempted was at Texas Motor Speedway with J. J. Yeley behind the wheel, who parked the car after 5 laps. That season, Harmon ran 14 races and Yeley ran 2, all of them being start and parks.

In 2012, Harmon remained to start and park the car, with Kevin Lepage, Rick Crawford, David Green and Scott Riggs being brought in for one race apiece. 

During 2013, Harmon began to bring in many new drivers. That season, Harmon himself only drove seven races, with Kevin Lepage, Juan Carlos Blum, Danny Efland, Carl Long and Kevin O'Connell running races. Notably, the team did not start and park in most races they entered that year. O'Connell scored the team their best non-superspeedway finish up to then, a 22nd-place finish at Road America while staying on the lead lap. Harmon also scored their best finish up to then at Daytona, finishing 17th on the lead lap. 

Harmon ran most races in 2014, and they start and parked most times. Kevin Lepage, Mike Wallace, Reuse brothers Bobby and Roger also had seat time. The team's best finish that year was a 24th-place finish at Mid-Ohio with Bobby Reuse, 6 laps down. 

For 2015, Harmon attempted 29 races in the 74, start and parking in 12 races and failing to qualify in two of them, Talladega and Charlotte. The Reuse brothers returned, with Bobby driving at Watkins Glen and Roger driving at Road America. Jordan Anderson drove at Bristol, and Tim Viens drove in the finale race at Homestead-Miami. Harmon scored the team's best finish at Daytona, a 24th-place finish after starting 19th, seven laps down.

On November 22, 2021, NASCAR suspended crew chief Ryan Bell for the first six races in 2022 for violating Section 5.1.a.c.d: Vehicle testing when the team brought the No. 74 car to Rockingham Speedway (which is currently unsanctioned by NASCAR) for a charity event. In addition, the team will have 75 owner and driver points deducted at the start of the 2022 season.

Legal issues
On May 15, 2013, Harmon was arrested and charged with stealing a hauler and racing equipment belonging to fellow competitor Jennifer Jo Cobb, in association with his sister and Cobb's former partner Dave Novak; Harmon stated that he was innocent. On May 28, officials from the Rowan County Sheriff's Office seized five Camping World Truck Series trucks and two Nationwide Series cars, which were stated as belonging to Cobb, from Harmon's garage. An arrest warrant was issued for Harmon in the case on June 16, 2013; Harmon turned himself in the following day and was released on a $10,000 bond pending trial. In October, Cobb requested that the charges be dropped, and they were shortly thereafter.

Motorsports career results

NASCAR
(key) (Bold – Pole position awarded by qualifying time. Italics – Pole position earned by points standings or practice time. * – Most laps led.)

Winston Cup Series

Daytona 500

Xfinity Series

Camping World Truck Series

ARCA Racing Series
(key) (Bold – Pole position awarded by qualifying time. Italics – Pole position earned by points standings or practice time. * – Most laps led.)

References

External links
 
 
 

Living people
1958 births
People from Jefferson County, Alabama
Racing drivers from Alabama
NASCAR drivers
NASCAR team owners
ARCA Menards Series drivers
American Speed Association drivers